Stafford Heights is a northern suburb in the City of Brisbane, Queensland, Australia.

Geography 

Stafford Heights is generally hilly, and has one major waterway, Downfall Creek. Stafford Heights is north of Stafford.

History 

Stafford Heights is named because it is on higher ground than its neighbouring Stafford. The Heights name was used locally as a neighbourhood name from the 1950s, but it became a gazetted suburb in 1975. Stafford was a name adopted by local consent in 1885–1886, after Staffordshire in England.

Stafford Heights State School opened on 3 April 1956.

Somerset Hills State School opened on 24 January 1966.

A small part of north-east Stafford Heights is part of Paramount Estate, a plan which involved naming the streets after the last names of actors at around the 1970s. The majority of Paramount Estate lies in McDowall.

Since the 1970s, the population of this suburb has been slow declining, as is shown by the census figures for population.

In 2002, Queen of Apostles Catholic Primary School opened its lower campus for younger students. Its original "upper" campus opened on 30 January 1962 in Stafford to the south.

The median age of the Stafford Heights population was 38 years, 1 year above the Australian median. 76.9% of people living in Stafford Heights were born in Australia, compared to the national average of 69.8%; the next most common countries of birth were New Zealand 3.8%, England 2.6%, Italy 1.7%, Philippines 1%, India 0.5%. 84.7% of people spoke only English at home; the next most common languages were 2.9% Italian, 0.5% Greek, 0.4% Tagalog, 0.4% Cantonese, 0.4% Arabic.

Education
Stafford Heights State School is a government primary (Prep-6) school for boys and girls at 95 Redwood Street. In 2018, the school had an enrolment of 134 students with 14 teachers (10 full-time equivalent) and 14 non-teaching staff (8 full-time equivalent).

Somerset Hills State School is a government primary (Prep-6) school for boys and girls on the corner of Webster Road and Kitchener Road. In 2018, the school had an enrolment of 160 students with 16 teachers (12 full-time equivalent) and 13 non-teaching staff (9 full-time equivalent). It includes a special education program.

Queen of Apostles Catholic Primary School is a Catholic primary (Prep-6) school for boys and girls. The school has two campuses. The lower campus (Prep-2) is at 46 Chuter Street in Stafford Heights, while the upper campus (3-6) is at 10 Thuruna Street in neighbouring Stafford to the south. In 2018, the school had an enrolment of 486 students with 40 teachers (28 full-time equivalent) and 35 non-teaching staff (17 full-time equivalent).

There are no secondary schools in Stafford Heights. The nearest government secondary schools are Craigslea State High School in neighbouring Chermside West to the north, Everton Park State High School in neighbouring Everton Park to the south-west, and Wavell State High School in Wavell Heights to the east.

Amenities 
There are a number of parks in the area:

 Aldren Street Park
 Amott Street Park
 Broula Park
 Flockton Street Park
 Grey Gum Park
 Heilbromm Street Park
 Parton Street Park
 Sedgemoor Place Park
 Venetia Street Park
 Webster Road Park

References

External links

 
 
 

Suburbs of the City of Brisbane